The White Pass and Yukon Route (WP&Y, WP&YR)  is a Canadian and U.S. Class III  narrow-gauge railroad linking the port of Skagway, Alaska, with Whitehorse, the capital of Yukon. An isolated system, it has no direct connection to any other railroad. Equipment, freight and passengers are ferried by ship through the Port of Skagway, and via road through a few of the stops along its route.

The railroad began construction in 1898 during the Klondike Gold Rush as a means of reaching the goldfields. With its completion in 1900, it became the primary route to the interior of the Yukon, supplanting the Chilkoot Trail and other routes. The route continued operation until 1982, and in 1988 was partially revived as a heritage railway. In July 2018, the railway was purchased by Carnival Corporation & plc.

For many years the railroad was a subsidiary of Tri White Corporation, also the parent of Clublink,  and operated by the Pacific and Arctic Railway and Navigation Company (in Alaska), the British Columbia Yukon Railway Company (in British Columbia) and the British Yukon Railway Company, originally known as the British Yukon Mining, Trading and Transportation Company (in Yukon), which used the trade name White Pass and Yukon Route. The railroad was sold by Clublink to a joint venture controlled by Survey Point Holdings, with a minority holding by the Carnival Corporation & plc parent company of the Carnival Cruise Line.

The railway was designated as an international historic civil engineering landmark by the Canadian Society for Civil Engineering and the American Society of Civil Engineers in 1994.

History

Construction

The line was born of the Klondike Gold Rush of 1897. The most popular route taken by prospectors to the gold fields in Dawson City was a treacherous route from the port in Skagway or Dyea, Alaska, across the mountains to the Canada–US border at the summit of the Chilkoot Pass or the White Pass. There, the prospectors were not allowed across by Canadian authorities unless they had sufficient gear for the winter, typically one ton of supplies. This usually required several trips across the passes. There was a need for better transportation than pack horses used over the White Pass or human portage over the Chilkoot Pass. This need generated numerous railroad schemes. In 1897, the Canadian government received 32 proposals for Yukon railroads, and most were never realized.

Largely financed by British investors organized by Close Brothers merchant bank, a railroad was soon under construction. A  gauge was chosen by the railway contract builder Michael James Heney. The narrow roadbed required by narrow gauge greatly reduced costs when the roadbed was blasted in solid rock. Even so, 450 tons of explosives were used to reach White Pass summit. The narrow gauge also permitted tighter radii to be used on curves, making the task easier by allowing the railroad to follow the landscape more, rather than having to be blasted through it.

Construction started in May 1898, but they encountered obstacles in dealing with the Skagway city government and the town's crime boss, Soapy Smith. The company president, Samuel H. Graves (1852–1911), was elected as chairman of the vigilante organization that was trying to expel Soapy and his gang of confidence men and rogues. On the evening of July 8, 1898, Soapy Smith was killed in the Shootout on Juneau Wharf with guards at one of the vigilante's meetings. Samuel Graves witnessed the shooting. The railroad helped block off the escape routes of the gang, aiding in their capture, and the remaining difficulties in Skagway subsided.

On July 21, 1898, an excursion train hauled passengers for  out of Skagway, the first train to operate in Alaska. On July 30, 1898, the charter rights and concessions of the three companies were acquired by the White Pass & Yukon Railway Company Limited, a new company organized in London. The railway reached Bennett, British Columbia, on July 6, 1899. The construction crews working from Bennett along a difficult lakeshore reached Carcross the next year, and the last spike was driven on July 29, 1900, with service starting on August 1, 1900. By then much of the Gold Rush fever had died down.

At the time, the gold spike was actually a regular iron spike. A gold spike was on hand, but the gold was too soft and instead of being driven, was just hammered out of shape.

Early years

As the gold rush wound down, serious professional mining was taking its place; not so much for gold as for other metals such as copper, silver and lead. The closest port was Skagway, and the only route there was via the White Pass & Yukon Route's river boats and railroad.

While ores and concentrates formed the bulk of the traffic, the railroad also carried passenger traffic, and other freight. There was, for a long time, no easier way into the Yukon Territory, and no other way into or out of Skagway except by sea.

Financing and route was in place to extend the rails from Whitehorse to Carmacks, but there was chaos in the river transportation service, resulting in a bottleneck. The White Pass instead used the money to purchase most of the riverboats, providing a steady and reliable transportation system between Whitehorse and Dawson City.

While the WP&YR never built between Whitehorse and Fort Selkirk, some minor expansion of the railway occurred after 1900.  In 1901, the Taku Tram, a  portage railroad was built at Taku City, British Columbia, which was operated until 1951.  It carried passengers and freight between the SS Tutshi operating on Tagish Lake and the MV Tarahne operating across Atlin Lake to Atlin, British Columbia. (While Tutshi was destroyed by a suspicious fire around 1990, Tarahne was restored and hosts special dinners including murder mysteries.  Lifeboats built for Tutshi'''s restoration were donated to Tarahne.) The Taku Tram could not turn around, and simply backed up on its westbound run. The locomotive used, the Duchess, is now in Carcross.

In 1910, the WP&YR operated a branch line to Pueblo, a mining area near Whitehorse. This branch line was abandoned in 1918; a haul-road follows that course today but is mostly barricaded; a Whitehorse Star editorial in the 1980s noted that this route would be an ideal alignment if the Alaska Highway should ever require a bypass reroute around Whitehorse.

While all other railroads in the Yukon (such as the Klondike Mines Railway at Dawson City) had been abandoned by 1914, the WP&YR continued to operate.

During the Great Depression, traffic was sparse on the WP&YR, and for a time trains operated as infrequently as once a week.

World War II

Alaska became strategically important for the United States during World War II; there was concern that the Japanese might invade it, as Alaska was the closest part of the United States to Japan. Following the Attack on Pearl Harbor, the decision was made by the US and Canadian governments to construct the Alaska Highway as an all-weather overland route to ensure communication. One of the principal staging points for construction was Whitehorse, which could be supplied by the WP&YR.

By that time the railroad was a financially-starved remnant from Klondike gold rush days, with well-worn engines and rolling stock. Despite this, the railroad moved 67,496 tons during the first 9 months of 1942, more than double its prewar annual traffic. Even this was deemed insufficient, so the U.S. Government leased the railroad for the duration, effective at 12:01 a.m. on 1 October 1942, handing control to the United States Army. What became the 770th Railway Operating Battalion of the Military Railway Service took over train operations in company with the WP&Y's civilian staff. Major John E. Ausland, a former executive with the Chicago, Burlington and Quincy Railroad, was named superintendent, while Lieutenant Stanley Jerome Gaetz served as trainmaster.

Canadian law forbade foreign government agencies from operating within Canada and its territories, but Japanese forces had occupied some of the Aleutian Islands by this time, and an accommodation was quickly reached to "make an illegal action legal."
 
The MRS scoured the US for usable narrow-gauge locomotives and rolling stock, and soon a strange and colorful assortment began arriving at Skagway. The single-largest group was seven D&RGW K-28 class 2-8-2's acquired prior to the lease, in August 1942, 2-8-0's from the Silverton Northern and the Colorado & Southern, all over 40 years old, and a pair of ET&WNC 4-6-0's soon appeared, among others, as well as eleven new War Department Class S118 2-8-2's. WP&Y's original roster of 10 locomotives and 83 cars was soon eclipsed by the Army's additional 26 engines and 258 cars.
 
The increase in traffic was remarkable: in the last 3 months of 1942, the railroad moved 25,756 tons. In 1943, the line carried 281,962 tons, equivalent to ten years worth of typical prewar traffic: all this despite some of the most severe winter weather recorded since 1910; gales, snowdrifts and temperatures of -30 degrees F. succeeded in blockading the line from 5 – 15 February 1943 and 27 January – 14 February 1944.
 
The peak movement occurred on August 4, 1943, when the White Pass moved 38 trains north and south, totaling 3346 gross / 2085 net tons, and 2236 locomotive-miles in 24 hours.

Control of the railroad was handed back to its civilian operators late in 1944.

1946–1982

In May, 1947, the railroad purchased its last steam locomotives. These were a pair of 2-8-2 Mikado type engines built by the Baldwin Locomotive Works of Philadelphia, numbered No. 72 and No. 73.

In 1951, the White Pass and Yukon Corporation Ltd., a new holding company, was incorporated to acquire the three railway companies comprising the WP&YR from the White Pass and Yukon Company, Ltd., which was in liquidation. The railway was financially restructured. While most other narrow-gauge systems in North America were closing around this time, the WP&YR remained open. In 1959, the first dividend to stockholders was paid: 10 cents per share.

The railroad began dieselizing in the mid to late 1950s:  one of the few North American narrow-gauge railroads to do so. The railroad bought shovelnose diesels from General Electric, and later road-switchers from American Locomotive Company (ALCO) and Montreal Locomotive Works, as well as a few small switchers. On June 30, 1964, the line retired its last steam locomotive.

The railroad was an early pioneer of intermodal freight traffic, commonly called containerization; advertising of the time referred to it as the Container Route. The WP&YR owned an early container ship (Clifford J. Rogers, built in 1955), and in 1956 introduced containers, although these were far smaller than the truck-sized containers than came into use in the United States in 1956 and could not readily be handed off to other railroads or ship lines.

The Faro lead-zinc mine opened in 1969. The railway was upgraded with seven new  locomotives from ALCO, new freight cars, ore buckets, a straddle carrier at Whitehorse to transfer from the railway's new fleet of trucks, a new ore dock at Skagway, and assorted work on the rail line to improve alignment. In the fall of 1969, a new tunnel and bridge that bypassed Dead Horse Gulch were built to replace the tall steel cantilever bridge that could not carry the heavier trains. This enormous investment made the company dependent on continued ore traffic to earn the revenue, and left the railway vulnerable to loss of that ore-carrying business.

As well, passenger traffic on the WP&YR was increasing as cruise ships started to visit Alaska's Inside Passage. There was no road from Skagway to Whitehorse until 1978. Even after the road was built, the White Pass still survived on the ore traffic from the mines.

During this time, the green-yellow engine color scheme, with a thunderbird on the front, was replaced with blue, patterned with black and white. (The green-yellow scheme was restored in the early 1990s, along with the thunderbird. , however, one engine still had the blue color scheme. The steam engines, however, remained basic black.)

In 1982, metal prices plunged, striking with devastating effect on the mines that were the White Pass and Yukon Route's main customers. Many, including the Faro lead-zinc mine, closed down, and, with that traffic gone, the White Pass was doomed as a commercial railroad. Hopeful of a reopening, the railway ran at a significant loss for several months, carrying only passengers. However, the railway closed down on October 7, 1982.

Some of the road's ALCO diesels were sold to a railroad in Colombia, and three (out of four, and one of these was wrecked) of the newer ALCO diesels built by and in storage with ALCO's Canadian licensee MLW (Montreal Locomotive Works) were sold to US Gypsum in Plaster City, California. Only one of these modern narrow-gauge diesels, the last narrow-gauge diesel locomotives built for a North American customer, was delivered to the White Pass. The five diesels sold to Colombia were not used there as they were too heavy, and were re-acquired in 1999; one was nearly lost at sea during a storm as it broke loose on the barge and slowly rolled towards the edge.

The railway was the focus of the first episode of the BBC Television series Great Little Railways in 1983.

Heritage railway: 1988–present

The shutdown, however, was not for long. Tourism to Alaska began to increase, with many cruise ships stopping at Skagway. The scenery of the White Pass route sounded like a great tourist draw; and the rails of the White Pass & Yukon Route were laid right down to the docks, even along them, for the former freight and cruise ship traffic. Cruise operators, remembering the attraction of the little mountain climbing trains to their passengers, pushed for a re-opening of the line as a heritage railway. The White Pass was and is perfectly positioned to sell a railroad ride through the mountains to cruise ship tourists; they do not even have to walk far from their ships.

Following a deal between White Pass and the United Transportation Union, representing Alaska employees of the road, the White Pass Route was reopened between Skagway and White Pass in 1988: purely for tourist passenger traffic. The White Pass Route also bid on the ore-haul from the newly reopened Faro mine, but its price was considerably higher than road haulage over the Klondike Highway.

The railway still uses vintage parlor cars, the oldest four built in 1881 and predating WP&YR by 17 years, and four new cars built in 2007 follow the same 19th-century design. At least eight cars have wheelchair lifts.
A work train reached Whitehorse on September 22, 1988, its intent being to haul two locomotives, parked in Whitehorse for six years, to Skagway to be overhauled and used on the tourist trains. While in Whitehorse for approximately one week, it hauled the parked rolling stock – flatcars, tankers and a caboose – out of the downtown area's sidings, and the following year, they were hauled further south, many eventually sold. Most of the tracks in downtown Whitehorse have now been torn up, and the line's terminus is six city blocks south of the old train depot at First Avenue and Main Street. A single new track along the waterfront once enabled the operation of the Whitehorse Waterfront Trolley, a tourist line run by a local historical society.

After customs and Canadian Labour Union jurisdictional issues were resolved, the WP&YR main line reopened to Fraser in 1989, and to Bennett in 1992. A train reached Carcross station in 1997 to participate in the Ton of Gold centennial celebration. A special passenger run, by invitation only, was made from Carcross to Whitehorse on October 10, 1997, and there are plans to eventually re-open the entire line north to Whitehorse if a market exists. So far, the tracks are only certified to Carcross by the Canadian Transportation Agency; on July 29, 2006, White Pass ran a train to Carcross and announced passenger service would begin in May 2007, six trains per week, with motorcoach return trips. Even when the length of the unused portion of the line is excluded, the WP&YR is longer than other notable North American narrow-gauge railroads, such as the Cumbres & Toltec Scenic Railroad and the Durango & Silverton Narrow Gauge Railroad.

WP&YR acquired some rolling stock from Canadian National's Newfoundland operations, which shut down in November,1988; the acquisition included 8 side-pivot, drop-side air dump cars for large rocks, and 8 longitudinal hoppers for ballast, still painted in CN orange. These cars were converted from Newfoundland's  gauge bogies to White Pass and Yukon Route's 3 ft (914 mm)   narrow gauge bogies.

Most trains are hauled by the line's diesel locomotives, painted in green (lower) and yellow (upper), but one of the line's steam locomotives is still in operation too, No. 73, a 2-8-2 Mikado-type locomotive. Another steam locomotive, No. 40 a 2-8-0 Consolidation type locomotive was on loan from the  Georgetown Loop R.R. in Colorado for upwards of five years, but was returned after only two years. Former WP&Y 69, a 2-8-0, was re-acquired in 2001, rebuilt, and re-entered service in 2008.

Also operational, a few times a year, is an original steam-powered rotary snowplow, an essential device in the line's commercial service days. (The rotaries were retired in 1964, along with the remaining steam engines that pushed them, and snow clearing was done by caterpillar tractor.) While it is not needed, as the tourist season is only in the summer months, it is a spectacle in operation, and the White Pass runs the steam plow for railfan groups once or twice a winter, pushed by two diesel locomotives (in 2000 only, it was pushed by two steam locomotives, Nos. 73 and 40).

The centennial of the Golden Spike at Carcross was re-enacted on July 29, 2000, complete with two steam engines meeting nose-to-nose (No. 73 and No. 40), and a gold-coated steel spike being driven by a descendant of WP&YR contractor Michael James Heney.

One organization chartered a steam-pulled train from Carcross to Fraser, with a stopover at Bennett, on Friday, June 24, 2005.  When expected participants seemed unlikely to arrive in the planned numbers, surplus seats were sold to the public, 120 USD or 156 CAD, with bus return to Carcross from Fraser. This represents the first paid passenger trips out of Carcross since 1982, a feature that started regular service in 2007.

White Pass president Gary Danielsen advised a CBC Radio interviewer that service to Whitehorse would require an enormous capital investment to restore the tracks, but the company is willing if there is either a passenger or freight potential to make it cost-effective.

A June, 2006 report on connecting Alaska to the continental railroad network suggested Carmacks as a hub, with a branch line to Whitehorse and beyond to either Skagway or Haines, Alaska.

In addition to the restoration of the actual rail line, several former White Pass steam locomotives are currently in operation at tourist attractions in the Southeastern United States. Locomotives 70, 71, and 192 are at the Dollywood amusement park in Pigeon Forge, Tennessee. Locomotive 190 is at the Tweetsie Railroad in Boone, North Carolina.

In late June, 2010, the railroad and the City of Skagway entered into an agreement whereby the two would jointly advocate for the restoration of freight service on the line, including the revival of the trackage north of Carcross back to Whitehorse and the possibility of constructing new track north from Whitehorse to Carmacks. The expansion would require federal funds, and, if completed, would serve the region's mining industry.

In July, 2018, the railway was purchased by Klondike Holdings and Carnival Corporation & plc, in a joint venture. Carnival Corp buys Alaska heritage railroad Railway Age June 15, 2018.

Accidents
In 1951, engine No. 70 caught a guardrail with its snowplow and rolled over on its side. The locomotive is still in operation at Dollywood in Pigeon Forge, Tennessee, working on the Dollywood Express.

In 1994, during rock removal operations, a backhoe operator accidentally struck a petroleum pipeline near the railroad tracks.
Roadmaster Edward Hanousek Jr. and President M. Paul Taylor Jr. were charged with several crimes associated with the accident.  Both men maintained their innocence throughout many years of extensive litigation.  After remand by the 9th Circuit Court of Appeals, the President settled on a plea agreement on misdemeanor charges of making negligent misrepresentations to the Coast Guard.  The Roadmaster was convicted on negligence-related charges.

Passenger operations on the blocked section had ended for the season just before the accident. In February, 2007, Engine 114 was taken for repair to the Coast Engine and Equipment Company (CEECO) in Tacoma, Washington.

On July 23, 2014 a derailment occurred involving two vintage diesel locomotives and four passenger rail cars. The accident was due to a broken throw rod at a switch. Both locomotives derailed, and the rails broke. There were nine minor injuries initially reported, and those passengers were treated and released in Skagway. Later reports state that 19 passengers and four railroad employees were injured. Due to the derailment, the line was temporarily suspended, but service resumed.

Rosters of White Pass Locomotives and Cars, Boats, and Winter Stages
For the roster of White Pass locomotives and railroad cars, see List of White Pass and Yukon Route locomotives and cars.

For the roster of White Pass boats, see List of steamboats on the Yukon River.

For the roster of White Pass winter stages, see'' Overland Trail (Yukon).

War Department Baldwin 2-8-2 Locomotives
There are two persistent myths that show up in almost every book or article which mentions the role of the White Pass & Yukon Route in the building of the Alaska Highway during the Second World War. The myths concern the eleven new USATC S118 Class locomotives that the United States Army Transportation Corps brought to the WP&YR in 1943. Myth No. 1 is that they were converted from  gauge to  gauge by the WP&YR shops in Skagway, Alaska. Myth No. 2 is that they were built for Iran and diverted to the WP&YR.

These locomotives, designated USA 190 to USA 200, were constructed by Baldwin Locomotive Works as  gauge and shipped fully assembled. No modification was needed. The MacArthur was designed by the American Locomotive Company for  gauge and the smaller gauges were accommodated with various widths spacers (rings) between the wheels and the truck side frames on same length axles. In total, nearly 800 MacArthurs were produced by ALCO, Baldwin, and a few other manufacturers.

The reason USA 190–200 were never destined for "Iran" as is often mistakenly stated in books relating WP&YR history, is that Iran's government railway was, and is, . Also, because of scarce water and extensive tunnels, Iran was the first case where the Army primarily used diesel locomotives. USATC narrow-gauge locomotives were never destined for Iran.

The first locomotives of the MacArthur design that Baldwin Locomotive Works built were USA 190–200 for the WP&YR, which makes them unique. This initial 1942 sales order to Baldwin for 60 MacArthur  gauge locomotives was for India's extensive meter-gauge railway system. The first eleven were diverted to the WP&YR as  gauge, the next 15 went to India as meter gauge, another 20 went to Queensland Rail as  gauge, and the remaining 14 were meter gauge for India where the order was destined before the Alaskan and Australian diversions.

Gallery

See also

 List of heritage railways in Canada
 List of heritage railroads in the United States
 List of narrow-gauge railways in British Columbia
 Narrow-gauge railways in Canada
 List of Historic Civil Engineering Landmarks

References

General references

External links

Historic WP&Y route map
A WP&YR friend and fan web site by Boerries Burkhardt
4/15/1899; The first railway to the Klondike - The White Pass and Yukon Railway
Davies/Scroggie Collection of White Pass and Yukon Documents and Ephemera. Yale Collection of Western Americana, Beinecke Rare Book and Manuscript Library

3 ft gauge railways in the United States
3 ft gauge railways in Canada
Narrow gauge railways in British Columbia
Narrow gauge railways in Yukon
Narrow gauge railroads in Alaska
Heritage railways in British Columbia
Heritage railways in Yukon
Heritage railroads in Alaska
Defunct Alaska railroads
Defunct British Columbia railways
Defunct Yukon railways
Passenger railroads in Alaska
Passenger railways in British Columbia
Passenger railways in Yukon
Transportation in Municipality of Skagway Borough, Alaska
Klondike Gold Rush
Historic American Engineering Record in Alaska
Historic Civil Engineering Landmarks
Tourist attractions in the Municipality of Skagway Borough, Alaska
Carnival Corporation & plc